The Ram 1500 Revolution Electric Vehicle (REV) is a battery electric full-size light duty truck based on the fifth generation Ram, announced by FCA US LLC. in July 2021, and first revealed to the public as a concept vehicle in January 2023.

History 
In July 2021, Stellantis announced the ongoing development of an electrified Ram pickup as part of Stellantis EV DAY 2021, including early concept drawings of the vehicle, and stating that a full size battery electric Ram would arrive by 2024. There is also reference to a future range-extender plug-in hybrid model.

The Ram Revolution Concept vehicle was revealed on Ram social media outlets in January 2023, showcasing a futuristic design and various high-tech features, including an augmented reality head-up display, rear suicide doors, and a collapsible pass-through between the bed and cab. A webpage on the Ram website also went live for the concept model.

Shortly after, the concept made its first physical appearance at the 2023 Consumer Electronics Show. A press release by Stellantis stated that the vehicle would be based on their new STLA platform specifically designed for full-size body-on-frame EVs, will be powered by dual electric motors in an all-wheel drive configuration, and will be based on an 800-volt architecture. It is claimed that the concept pickup offers 4 wheel steering, and charging speeds up to 350 kilowatts, which would allow for adding up to 100 miles of range in approximately 10 minutes of charging.

In February 2023, a commercial "Premature Electrification" was shown during the 2023 Super Bowl, humorously parodying premature ejaculation advertisements in referring to EV adoption hurdles such as range anxiety, and featuring Canadian-American actor Jason Jones. The commercial reveals for the first time a pre-production model that shares much of its exterior and interior with the current fifth generation Ram pickup, with appearance changes to most notably the front fascia. The ad also confirms the shortened name of Ram REV (said as "rev"), availability in the US expected in late 2024, and "Range-lengthening technology to come later".

Following the Super Bowl advertisement, reservations were opened on the Ram REV webpage, allowing users to pay a refundable fee to become a Ram REV Insider+ member, with the promise of exclusive privileges such as early access to pre-orders and invitations to events such as first looks and test drives as they become available.

Description 
As of February 2023, what has been revealed of the REV shows the truck being based on the fifth-generation Ram, sharing much of its exterior and interior with the standard internal combustion model. Most notably altered is the front fascia of the vehicle, to improve aerodynamics as there is no need for a large grille opening. The REV features unique headlights, front bumper, and hood to accommodate the front trunk ("frunk"). The rear of the truck also has unique differences such as taillights that extend onto the tailgate. A single charge port is located on the front left fender of the vehicle, containing a CCS Combo connector and charging status indicator LEDs.

References 

Electric concept cars
Ram Trucks
Pickup trucks
Electric trucks